Montcalm may refer to:

People
 Louis-Joseph de Montcalm (1712–1759), commander of the French forces in North America during the French and Indian War
 Noelle Montcalm (born 1988), Canadian hurdler
 Térez Montcalm (born 1963), Canadian jazz singer and songwriter

Vessels
 , four ships of the French Navy
 , a United States Navy fleet ocean tug
 , a British cargo liner

Places

Algeria
 Tamlouka, a small village formerly known as Montcalm

Canada
 Rural Municipality of Montcalm, Manitoba
 Montcalm, Quebec, a municipality
 Montcalm Regional County Municipality, Quebec
 Montcalm (provincial electoral district), a former Quebec provincial electoral district
 Montcalm (electoral district), a federal electoral district in Quebec

France
 Montcalm Massif, in the Pyrenees
 Pic de Montcalm, a mountain peak in the Pyrenees
 Montcalm (Vauvert), a small hamlet near Vauvert 
 Rue Montcalm, a residential street in the 18th arrondissement of Paris named after Louis-Joseph de Montcalm

United States
 Montcalm, New Hampshire, an unincorporated community
 Montcalm, West Virginia, a census-designated place
 Montcalm Township, Michigan
 Montcalm County, Michigan

Schools
 Montcalm Community College, Sidney, Michigan, United States
 Montcalm High School, part of the Mercer County Schools (West Virginia) School District
 Montcalm Secondary School, London, Ontario, Canada

Other uses
 The Montcalm Hotel, a group of luxury hotels in central London
 HMCS Montcalm, a Royal Canadian Navy reserve unit
 Montcalm Sanitarium, a former tuberculosis treatment facility in Colorado Springs, Colorado, United States
 Montcalm mine, near Timmins, Ontario, Canada, owned by Falconbridge Ltd.
 Marathon du Montcalm, a former Skyrunner World Series race
 Montcalm, a model of the Meteor (automobile) first offered by Ford in Canada in 1959

See also 
 Montcalm Street station, a streetcar station in Detroit, Michigan, United States
 Mount Calm, Texas, United States, a town